Jorge Délano Frederick (December 4, 1895 - July 9, 1980) was a Chilean cartoonist, screenwriter, film director, and actor. He was a caricaturist for La Nación, and he won the María Moors Cabot International Journalism Prize in 1952 and the National Prize for Journalism in 1964.

References

External links
Jorge Délano on IMDb

1895 births
1980 deaths
People from Santiago
Chilean cartoonists
Chilean film directors
Chilean screenwriters
Male screenwriters
Male actors from Santiago
Maria Moors Cabot Prize winners
20th-century Chilean male actors
20th-century screenwriters